Phyllocnistis diaugella is a moth of the family Gracillariidae. It is known from New South Wales and Queensland in Australia.

The larvae feed on Breynia species (including Breynia oblongifolia) and Euphorbia sparrmannii. They probably mine the leaves of their host plant.

References

Phyllocnistis
Endemic fauna of Australia